Chloridops is an extinct genus of Hawaiian honeycreeper in the subfamily Carduelinae of the family Fringillidae.

Distribution
The birds were endemic to Hawaii. It comprised three species: two on the Big Island of Hawaii; and one that inhabited Kauai, Oahu, and Maui.

Species
The genus includes the following three species:

Kona grosbeak (Chloridops kona) — extinct (1894)
Wahi grosbeak (Chloridops wahi) — prehistoric
King Kong grosbeak (Chloridops regiskongi) — prehistoric

See also

References

 
Hawaiian honeycreepers
Endemic fauna of Hawaii
Extinct birds of Hawaii
Holocene extinctions
Bird genera
Carduelinae
Higher-level bird taxa restricted to the Australasia-Pacific region
Taxa named by Scott Barchard Wilson
Taxonomy articles created by Polbot